Sabine Pakora is a French-Ivorian actress.

Debut 
Sabine Pakora studied acting at the Ecole supérieur d’art dramatique de Paris and Conservatoire d’Art Dramatique de Montpellier.

Filmography

Theatre

References

External links

Living people
21st-century French actresses
French people of Ivorian descent
Ivorian actresses
French film actresses
French television actresses
Year of birth missing (living people)